Roger Keith "Syd" Barrett (6 January 1946 – 7 July 2006) was an English singer, songwriter, and musician who co-founded the rock band Pink Floyd in 1965. Barrett was their original frontman and primary songwriter, becoming known for his whimsical style of psychedelia, English-accented singing, and stream-of-consciousness writing style. As a guitarist, he was influential for his free-form playing and for employing effects such as dissonance, distortion, echo and feedback.

Originally trained as a painter, Barrett was musically active for less than ten years. With Pink Floyd, he recorded four singles, their debut album The Piper at the Gates of Dawn (1967), portions of their second album A Saucerful of Secrets (1968), and several unreleased songs. In April 1968, Barrett was ousted from the band amid speculation of mental illness and his excessive use of psychedelic drugs. He began a brief solo career in 1969 with the single "Octopus" and followed with the albums The Madcap Laughs (1970) and Barrett (1970), recorded with the aid of several members of Pink Floyd.

In 1972, Barrett left the music industry, retired from public life and strictly guarded his privacy until his death. He continued painting and dedicated himself to gardening. Pink Floyd recorded several tributes and homages to him, including the 1975 song suite "Shine On You Crazy Diamond" and the 1979 rock opera The Wall. In 1988, EMI released an album of unreleased tracks and outtakes, Opel, with Barrett's approval. In 1996, Barrett was inducted into the Rock and Roll Hall of Fame as a member of Pink Floyd. He died of pancreatic cancer in 2006.

Life and career

Early years 
Roger Keith Barrett was born on 6 January 1946 in Cambridge to a middle-class family living at 60 Glisson Road. He was the fourth of five children. His father, Arthur Max Barrett, was a prominent pathologist and was said to be related to Elizabeth Garrett Anderson through Max's maternal grandmother Ellen Garrett. In 1951, his family moved to 183 Hills Road.

Barrett played piano occasionally but usually preferred writing and drawing. He bought a ukulele aged 10, a banjo at 11 and a Höfner acoustic guitar at 14. A year after he purchased his first acoustic guitar, he bought his first electric guitar and built his own amplifier. He was a Scout with the 7th Cambridge troop and went on to be a patrol leader.

According to one story, at the age of 14, Barrett acquired the nickname Syd after an old Cambridge jazz bassist, Sid "the Beat" Barrett; Barrett changed the spelling to differentiate himself. By another account, when Barrett was 13, his schoolmates nicknamed him Syd after he came to a field day at Abington Scout site wearing a flat cap instead of his scout beret, because "Syd" was a "working-class" name. He used both names interchangeably for several years. His sister Rosemary said: "He was never Syd at home. He would never have allowed it."

At one point at Morley Memorial Junior School, Barrett was taught by the mother of future Pink Floyd bassist Roger Waters. Later, in 1957, he attended Cambridgeshire High School for Boys with Waters. His father died of cancer on 11 December 1961, less than a month before Barrett's 16th birthday. On this date, Barrett left the entry in his diary blank. By this time, his siblings had left home and his mother rented out rooms to lodgers.

Eager to help her son recover from his grief, Barrett's mother encouraged the band in which he played, Geoff Mott and the Mottoes, a band which Barrett formed, to perform in their front room. Waters and Barrett were childhood friends, and Waters often visited such gigs. At one point, Waters organised a gig, a CND benefit at Friends Meeting House on 11 March 1962, but shortly afterwards Geoff Mott joined the Boston Crabs, and the Mottoes broke up.

In September 1962, Barrett had taken a place at the art department of the Cambridgeshire College of Arts and Technology, where he met David Gilmour. In late 1962 and early 1963, the Beatles made an impact on Barrett, and he began to play Beatles songs at parties and at picnics. In 1963, Barrett became a Rolling Stones fan and, with then-girlfriend Libby Gausden, saw them perform at a village hall in Cambridgeshire.

At this point, Barrett started writing songs; one friend recalls hearing "Effervescing Elephant" (later to be recorded on his solo album Barrett). Also around this time, Barrett and Gilmour occasionally played acoustic gigs together. Barrett had played bass guitar with Those Without in mid-1963 and bass and guitar with the Hollerin' Blues the next summer. In 1964, Barrett and Gausden saw Bob Dylan perform. After this performance, Barrett was inspired to write "Bob Dylan Blues". Barrett, now thinking about his future, decided to apply for Camberwell College of Arts in London. He enrolled in the college in the summer of 1964 to study painting.

Pink Floyd years (1965–1968) 

Starting in 1964, the band that would become Pink Floyd evolved through various line-up and name changes including the Abdabs, the Screaming Abdabs, Sigma 6 and the Meggadeaths. In 1965, Barrett joined them as the Tea Set (sometimes spelled T-Set). When they found themselves playing a concert with another band of the same name, Barrett came up with the Pink Floyd Sound (also known as the Pink Floyd Blues Band, later the Pink Floyd. During 1965, they went into a studio for the first time, when a friend of Richard Wright's gave the band free time to record.

During this summer Barrett had his first LSD trip in the garden of friend Dave Gale, with Ian Moore and Storm Thorgerson. During one trip, Barrett and another friend, Paul Charrier, ended up naked in the bath, reciting: "No rules, no rules". That summer, as a result of the continued drug use, the band became absorbed in Sant Mat, a Sikh sect. Storm Thorgerson (then living on Earlham Street) and Barrett went to a London hotel to meet the sect's guru; Thorgerson managed to join the sect; Barrett, however, was deemed too young to join. Thorgerson saw this as a deeply important event in Barrett's life, as he was extremely upset by the rejection. While living near his friends, Barrett decided to write more songs ("Bike" was written around this time).

London Underground, Blackhill Enterprises and gigs 

While Pink Floyd began by playing cover versions of American R&B songs, by 1966 they had carved out their own style of improvised rock and roll, which drew as much from improvised jazz. After Bob Klose departed from the band, the band's direction changed. However, the change was not instantaneous, with more improvising on the guitars and keyboards. Drummer Nick Mason reflected, "It always felt to me that most of the ideas were emanating from Syd at the time."

At this time, Barrett's reading reputedly included Grimm's Fairy Tales, Tolkien's The Hobbit and The Lord of the Rings, and The I-Ching. During this period, Barrett wrote most of the songs for Pink Floyd's first album, and also songs that would later appear on his solo albums. In 1966, a new rock concert venue, the UFO (pronounced as "you-foe"), opened in London and quickly became a haven for British psychedelic music. Pink Floyd, the house band, was its most popular attraction and after making appearances at the rival Roundhouse, became the most popular musical group of the London underground psychedelic music scene.

By the end of 1966, Pink Floyd had gained a reliable management team in Andrew King and Peter Jenner. Towards the end of October 1966, Pink Floyd, with King and Jenner, set up Blackhill Enterprises, to manage the group's finances. Blackhill was staffed by lodgers Jenner found in his Edbrooke Road house, and among others, Barrett's flatmate, Peter Wynne Wilson (who became road manager, however, since he had more experience in lighting, he was also lighting assistant). King and Jenner wanted to prepare some demo recordings for a possible record deal, so at the end of October, they booked a session at Thompson Private Recording Studio, in Hemel Hempstead. King said of the demos: "That was the first time I realised they were going to write all their own material, Syd just turned into a songwriter, it seemed like overnight."

King and Jenner befriended American expatriate Joe Boyd, the promoter of the UFO Club, who was making a name for himself as one of the more important entrepreneurs on the British music scene. The newly hired booking agent, Bryan Morrison, and Boyd had proposed sending in better quality recordings. From Morrison's agency the band played a gig outside London for the first time. In November, the band performed the first (of many) strangely named concerts: Philadelic Music for Simian Hominids, a multimedia event arranged by the group's former landlord, Mike Leonard, at Hornsey College of Art. They performed at the Free School for the following two weeks, before performing at the Psychodelphia Versus Ian Smith event at the Roundhouse in December, arranged by the Majority Rule for Rhodesia Campaign, and an Oxfam benefit at the Albert Hall (the band's biggest venue up to this point).

Tonite Let's All Make Love in London 

At the beginning of 1967, Barrett was dating Jenny Spires. However, unknown to Barrett, Spires had an affair with Peter Whitehead. Spires convinced Whitehead (who thought the band sounded like "bad Schoenberg") to use Pink Floyd in a film about the swinging London scene. At the cost of £80, in January, Whitehead took the band into John Wood's Sound Techniques in Chelsea, with the promoter Joe Boyd. They recorded a 16-minute version of "Interstellar Overdrive" and another composition, "Nick's Boogie". Whitehead had filmed this recording, which was used in the film Tonite Let's All Make Love in London and later on the video release of London '66–'67. Whitehead later said the band "were just completely welded together, just like a jazz group".

The Piper at the Gates of Dawn 

Boyd attempted to sign the band with Polydor Records. However, Morrison had convinced King and Jenner to try to start a bidding war between Polydor and EMI. In late January, Boyd produced a recording session for the group, with them returning to Sound Techniques in Chelsea again. After the bidding war idea was finished, Pink Floyd signed with EMI. Unusual for the time, the deal included recording an album, which meant the band had unlimited studio time at EMI Studios in return for a smaller royalty percentage. The band then attempted to re-record "Arnold Layne", but the Boyd version from January was released instead.

The band's first studio album, The Piper at the Gates of Dawn, was recorded intermittently between February and July 1967 in Studio 3 at Abbey Road Studios, and produced by former Beatles engineer Norman Smith. By the time the album was released on 4 August, "Arnold Layne" (which was released months earlier, on 11 March) had reached number 20 on the British singles charts, despite being banned by Radio London, and the follow-up single, "See Emily Play", had peaked at number 5. The album was successful in the UK, hitting number 6 on the British album charts. Their first three singles (including their third, "Apples and Oranges"), were written by Barrett, who also was the principal visionary/author of their critically acclaimed 1967 debut album. Of the eleven songs on Piper, Barrett wrote eight and co-wrote another two.

Health problems 
Through late 1967 and early 1968, Barrett became increasingly erratic, partly as a consequence of his heavy use of psychedelic drugs such as LSD. Once described as joyful, friendly, and extroverted, he became increasingly depressed and withdrawn, and experienced hallucinations, disorganised speech, memory lapses, intense mood swings, and periods of catatonia. Although the changes began gradually, he went missing for a long weekend and, according to several friends, including Wright, came back "a completely different person".

One of the striking features of his change was the development of a blank, dead-eyed stare. Barrett did not recognise friends, and often did not know where he was; on a tour of Los Angeles, Barrett is said to have exclaimed, "Gee, it sure is nice to be in Las Vegas!" Many reports described him on stage, strumming one chord through the entire concert, or not playing at all. At a show in Santa Monica, Barrett slowly detuned his guitar.

Interviewed on The Pat Boone Show show during the tour, Barrett replied with a "blank and totally mute stare"; according to Mason, "Syd wasn't into moving his lips that day." Barrett exhibited similar behaviour during the band's first appearance on Dick Clark's television show American Bandstand. Surviving footage of this appearance shows Barrett miming his parts competently; however, during a group interview afterwards, Barrett gave terse answers. During this time, Barrett would often forget to bring his guitar to sessions, damage equipment and was occasionally unable to hold his plectrum. Before a performance in late 1967, Barrett reportedly crushed Mandrax tranquilliser tablets and a tube of Brylcreem into his hair, which melted down his face under the heat of the stage lighting, making him look like "a guttered candle". Mason disputed the Mandrax portion of this story, saying that "Syd would never waste good mandies".

Departure from Pink Floyd 
During Pink Floyd's UK tour with Jimi Hendrix in November 1967, guitarist David O'List from the Nice substituted for Barrett on several occasions when he was unable to perform or failed to appear. Around Christmas, Pink Floyd asked Barrett's schoolfriend David Gilmour to join as a second guitarist to cover for Barrett. For a handful of shows, Gilmour played and sang while Barrett wandered around on stage, occasionally joining the performance. The other band members grew tired of Barrett's antics and, on 26 January 1968, when Waters was driving on the way to a show at Southampton University, they elected not to pick Barrett up. One person in the car said, "Shall we pick Syd up?" and another said, "Let's not bother." As Barrett had written the bulk of the band's material, the plan was to retain him as a non-touring member, as the Beach Boys had done with Brian Wilson, but this proved impractical.

According to Waters, Barrett came to what was to be their last practice session with a new song he had dubbed "Have You Got It Yet?" The song seemed simple when he first presented it, but it soon became impossibly difficult to learn; the band eventually realised that Barrett was changing the arrangement as they played, and that Barrett was playing a joke on them. Waters called it "a real act of mad genius".

Of the songs Barrett wrote for Pink Floyd after The Piper at the Gates of Dawn, only "Jugband Blues" was included on their album, A Saucerful of Secrets (1968). "Apples and Oranges" became an unsuccessful single, and "Scream Thy Last Scream" and "Vegetable Man" remained unreleased until 2016 in The Early Years 1965–1972 box set, as they were deemed too dark and unsettling. Barrett played guitar on the Saucerful of Secrets tracks "Remember a Day" and "Set the Controls for the Heart of the Sun".

Feeling guilty, the members of Pink Floyd did not tell Barrett that he was no longer in the band. According to Wright, who lived with Barrett at the time, he told Barrett he was going out to buy cigarettes when leaving to play a show. He would return hours later to find Barrett in the same position, sometimes with a cigarette burned completely down between his fingers. The incident was later referenced in the film Pink Floyd – The Wall. Emerging from catatonia and unaware that a long period had elapsed, Barrett would ask, "Have you got the cigarettes?"

Barrett spent time outside the recording studio, in the reception area, waiting to be invited in. He also came to a few performances and glared at Gilmour. On 6 April 1968, Pink Floyd officially announced that Barrett was no longer a member, the same day their contract with Blackhill Enterprises was terminated. Considering him the band's musical leader, Blackhill Enterprises retained Barrett.

Solo years (1968–1972) 

After leaving Pink Floyd, Barrett was out of the public eye for a year. In 1969, at the behest of EMI and Harvest Records, he embarked on a brief solo career, releasing two solo albums, The Madcap Laughs and Barrett (both 1970), and a single, "Octopus". Some songs, "Terrapin", "Maisie" and "Bob Dylan Blues", reflected Barrett's early interest in the blues.

The Madcap Laughs (1970) 

After Barrett left Pink Floyd, Jenner quit as their manager. He led Barrett into EMI Studios to record tracks in May that were released on Barrett's first solo album, The Madcap Laughs. However, Jenner said: "I had seriously underestimated the difficulties of working with him." By the sessions of June and July, most of the tracks were in better shape; however, shortly after the July sessions, Barrett broke up with his girlfriend Lindsay Corner and went on a drive around Britain, ending up in psychiatric care in Cambridge. During New Year 1969, Barrett, somewhat recovered, had taken up tenancy in a flat on Egerton Gardens, South Kensington, London, with the postmodernist artist Duggie Fields. Barrett's flat was so close to Gilmour's that Gilmour could look right into Barrett's kitchen. 

Deciding to return to music, Barrett contacted EMI and was passed to Malcolm Jones, the head of EMI's new prog rock label, Harvest. After Norman Smith and Jenner declined to produce Barrett's record, Jones produced it. Barrett wanted to recover the recordings made with Jenner; several of the tracks were improved upon. The sessions with Jones started in April 1969 at EMI Studios. After the first, Barrett brought in friends to help: the Humble Pie drummer Jerry Shirley, and the Willie Wilson, the drummer of Gilmour's old band Jokers Wild. For the sessions, Gilmour played bass. Jones said that communicating with Barrett was difficult: "It was a case of following him, not playing with him. They were seeing and then playing so they were always a note behind."  A few tracks on the album feature overdubs by members of Soft Machine.  During this time, Barrett also played guitar on the sessions for the Soft Machine founder Kevin Ayers' debut LP Joy of a Toy, although his performance on "Religious Experience", later titled "Singing a Song in the Morning", was not released until the album was reissued in 2003. 

At one point, Barrett told his flatmate that he was going for an afternoon drive, but followed Pink Floyd to Ibiza; according to legend, he skipped check-ins and customs, ran onto the runway and attempted to flag down a jet. One of his friends, J. Ryan Eaves, the bass player for the short-lived but influential Manchester band York's Ensemble, spotted him on a beach wearing dirty clothes and with a carrier bag full of money. During the trip, Barrett asked Gilmour for help in the recording sessions.

After two of the Gilmour/Waters-produced sessions, they remade one track from the Soft Machine overdubs and recorded three tracks. These sessions came to a minor halt when Gilmour and Waters were mixing Pink Floyd's newly recorded album, Ummagumma. However, through the end of July, they managed to record three more tracks. The problem with the recording was that the songs were recorded as Barrett played them "live" in studio. On the released versions a number of them have false starts and commentaries from Barrett. Despite the track being closer to complete and better produced, Gilmour and Waters left the Jones-produced track "Opel" off Madcap.

Gilmour later said of the sessions for The Madcap Laughs:

Upon the album's release in January 1970, Jones was shocked by the substandard musicianship on the songs produced by Gilmour and Waters: "I felt angry. It's like dirty linen in public and very unnecessary and unkind." Gilmour said: "Perhaps we were trying to show what Syd was really like. But perhaps we were trying to punish him." Waters was more positive: "Syd is a genius." Barrett said: "It's quite nice but I'd be very surprised if it did anything if I were to drop dead. I don't think it would stand as my last statement."

Barrett (1970) 

The second album, Barrett, was recorded more sporadically, the sessions taking place between February and July 1970. The album was produced by David Gilmour, and featured Gilmour on bass guitar, Richard Wright on keyboard and Humble Pie drummer Jerry Shirley. The first two songs attempted were for Barrett to play and/or sing to an existing backing track. However, Gilmour thought they were losing the "Barrett-ness". One track ("Rats") was originally recorded with Barrett on his own. That would later be overdubbed by musicians, despite the changing tempos. Shirley said of Barrett's playing: "He would never play the same tune twice. Sometimes Syd couldn't play anything that made sense; other times what he'd play was absolute magic." At times Barrett, who experienced synaesthesia, would say: "Perhaps we could make the middle darker and maybe the end a bit middle afternoonish. At the moment it's too windy and icy."

These sessions were happening while Pink Floyd had just begun to work on Atom Heart Mother. On various occasions, Barrett went to "spy" on the band as they recorded their album.

Wright said of the Barrett sessions:

Performances 
Despite the numerous recording dates for his solo albums, Barrett undertook very little musical activity between 1968 and 1972 outside the studio. On 24 February 1970, he appeared on John Peel's BBC radio programme Top Gear playing five songs—only one of which had been previously released. Three would be re-recorded for the Barrett album, while the song "Two of a Kind" was a one-off performance (possibly written by Richard Wright). Barrett was accompanied on this session by Gilmour and Shirley who played bass and percussion, respectively.

Gilmour and Shirley also backed Barrett for his one and only live concert during this period. The gig took place on 6 June 1970 at the Olympia Exhibition Hall as part of a Music and Fashion Festival. The trio performed four songs, "Terrapin", "Gigolo Aunt", "Effervescing Elephant" and "Octopus". Poor mixing left the vocals barely audible until part-way through the last number. At the end of the fourth song, Barrett unexpectedly but politely put down his guitar and walked off the stage. The performance has been bootlegged. Barrett made one last appearance on BBC Radio, recording three songs at their studios on 16 February 1971. All three came from the Barrett album. After this session, he took a hiatus from his music career that lasted more than a year, although in an extensive interview with Mick Rock and Rolling Stone in December, he discussed himself at length, showed off his new 12-string guitar, talked about touring with Jimi Hendrix and stated that he was frustrated in terms of his musical work because of his inability to find anyone good to play with.

Later years (1972–2006)

Stars and final recordings 

In February 1972, after a few guest spots in Cambridge with ex-Pink Fairies member Twink on drums and Jack Monck on bass using the name The Last Minute Put Together Boogie Band (backing visiting blues musician Eddie "Guitar" Burns and also featuring Henry Cow guitarist Fred Frith), the trio formed a short-lived band called Stars. Though they were initially well received at gigs in the Dandelion coffee bar and the town's Market Square, one of their gigs at the Corn Exchange in Cambridge with MC5 proved to be disastrous. A few days after this final show, Twink recalled that Barrett stopped him on the street, showed him a scathing review of the gig they had played, and quit on the spot, despite having played at least one subsequent gig at the same venue supporting Nektar.

Free from his EMI contract on 9 May 1972, Barrett signed a document that ended his association with Pink Floyd, and any financial interest in future recordings. He attended an informal jazz and poetry performance by Pete Brown and former Cream bassist Jack Bruce in October 1973. Brown arrived at the show late, and saw that Bruce was already onstage, along with "a guitarist I vaguely recognised", playing the Horace Silver tune "Doodlin'". Later in the show, Brown read out a poem, which he dedicated to Syd, because, "he's here in Cambridge, and he's one of the best songwriters in the country" when, to his surprise, the guitar player from earlier in the show stood up and said, "No I'm not". By the end of 1973, Barrett had returned to live in London, staying at various hotels and, in December of that year, settling in at Chelsea Cloisters. He had little contact with others, apart from his regular visits to his management's offices to collect his royalties, and the occasional visit from his sister Rosemary.

In August 1974, Jenner persuaded Barrett to return to Abbey Road Studios in hope of recording another album. According to John Leckie, who engineered these sessions, even at this point Syd still "looked like he did when he was younger ... long haired". The sessions lasted three days and consisted of blues rhythm tracks with tentative and disjointed guitar overdubs. Barrett recorded eleven tracks, the only one of which to be titled was "If You Go, Don't Be Slow". Once again, Barrett withdrew from the music industry, but this time for good. He sold the rights to his solo albums back to the record label and moved into a London hotel. During this period, several attempts to employ him as a record producer (including one by Jamie Reid on behalf of the Sex Pistols, and another by the Damned, who wanted him to produce their second album) were fruitless.

Wish You Were Here sessions 
Barrett visited the members of Pink Floyd in 1975 during the recording sessions for their ninth album, Wish You Were Here. He attended the Abbey Road session unannounced, and watched the band working on the final mix of "Shine On You Crazy Diamond"—a song about him. Barrett, then 29, was overweight and had shaved off all of his hair (including his eyebrows), and his former bandmates did not initially recognise him. Barrett spent part of the session brushing his teeth. Waters asked him what he thought of the song to which Barrett responded "sounds a bit old". He is reported to have briefly attended the reception for Gilmour's wedding to Ginger that immediately followed the recording sessions, but Gilmour said he had no recollection of this.

A few years later, Waters saw Barrett in the department store Harrods; Barrett ran away, dropping his bags, which Waters said were filled with candy. It was the last time any member of Pink Floyd saw him.

Withdrawal to Cambridge 
In 1978, when Barrett's money ran out, he moved back to Cambridge to live with his mother. He returned to live in London for a few weeks in 1982, but soon returned to Cambridge permanently. Until his death, he received royalties from his work with Pink Floyd; Gilmour said, "I made sure the money got to him." In 1996, Barrett was inducted into the Rock and Roll Hall of Fame as a member of Pink Floyd. He did not attend the ceremony.

According to biographer and journalist Tim Willis, Barrett, who had reverted to using his birth name Roger, continued to live in his late mother's semi-detached home, and had returned to painting, creating large abstract canvases. He was also an avid gardener. His main point of contact with the outside world was his sister, Rosemary, who lived nearby. He was reclusive, and his physical health declined, as he had stomach ulcers and type 2 diabetes.

Although Barrett had not appeared or spoken in public since the mid-1970s, reporters and fans travelled to Cambridge seeking him, despite public appeals from his family to stop. Apparently, Barrett did not like being reminded about his musical career and the other members of Pink Floyd had no direct contact with him. However, he did visit his sister's house in November 2001 to watch the BBC Omnibus documentary made about him; reportedly he found some of it "a bit noisy", enjoyed seeing Mike Leonard again, calling him his "teacher", and enjoyed hearing "See Emily Play".

Barrett made a final public acknowledgement of his musical past in 2002, his first since the 1970s, when he autographed 320 copies of photographer Mick Rock's book Psychedelic Renegades, which contained a number of photos of Barrett. In 1971, Rock conducted Barrett's final interview before his retirement from the music industry. Barrett visited Rock in London several times for tea and conversation in 1978. They had not spoken in more than 20 years when Rock approached Barrett to autograph his photography book, and Barrett uncharacteristically agreed. Having reverted to his birth name, he autographed the book "Barrett".

Death and tributes 
Barrett died at home in Cambridge on 7 July 2006 aged 60, from pancreatic cancer. He was cremated at a funeral held at Cambridge Crematorium on 18 July 2006; no Pink Floyd members attended. In a statement, Wright said: "The band are very naturally upset and sad to hear of Syd Barrett's death. Syd was the guiding light of the early band lineup and leaves a legacy which continues to inspire." Gilmour said: "Do find time to play some of Syd's songs and to remember him as the madcap genius who made us all smile with his wonderfully eccentric songs about bikes, gnomes, and scarecrows. His career was painfully short, yet he touched more people than he could ever know."

NME produced a tribute issue to Barrett a week later with a photo of him on the cover. In an interview with The Sunday Times, Barrett's sister, Rosemary Breen, said that he had written an unpublished book about the history of art. According to local newspapers, Barrett left approximately £1.7 million to his four siblings, largely acquired from royalties from Pink Floyd compilations and live recordings featuring Barrett's songs. A tribute concert, "Madcap's Last Laugh", was held at the Barbican Centre, London, on 10 May 2007 with Barrett's bandmates and Robyn Hitchcock, Captain Sensible, Damon Albarn, Chrissie Hynde and Kevin Ayers. Gilmour, Wright and Mason performed the Barrett compositions "Bike" and "Arnold Layne", and Waters performed a solo version of his song "Flickering Flame".

In 2006, Barrett's home in St. Margaret's Square, Cambridge, was put on the market and attracted considerable interest. After over 100 showings, many to fans, it was sold to a French couple who knew nothing about Barrett. On 28 November 2006, Barrett's other possessions were sold at an auction at Cheffins auction house in Cambridge, raising £120,000 for charity. Items sold included paintings, scrapbooks and everyday items that Barrett had decorated.

A series of events called The City Wakes was held in Cambridge in October 2008 to celebrate Barrett's life, art, and music. Breen supported this, the first series of official events in memory of her brother. After the festival's success, arts charity Escape Artists announced plans to create a centre in Cambridge, using art to help people with mental health problems. A memorial bench was placed in the Botanic Gardens in Cambridge and a more prominent tribute was planned in the city.

Legacy

Compilations 
In 1988, EMI Records (after constant pressure from Malcolm Jones) released an album of Barrett's studio out-takes and previously unreleased material recorded from 1968 to 1970 under the title Opel. The disc was originally set to include the unreleased Barrett Pink Floyd songs "Scream Thy Last Scream" and "Vegetable Man", which had been remixed for the album by Jones, but the band pulled the two songs before Opel was finalised. In 1993 EMI issued another release, Crazy Diamond, a boxed set of all three albums, each with further out-takes from his solo sessions that illustrated Barrett's inability or refusal to play a song the same way twice. EMI also released The Best of Syd Barrett: Wouldn't You Miss Me? in the UK on 16 April 2001 and in the US on 11 September 2001. This was the first time his song "Bob Dylan Blues" was officially released, taken from a demo tape that Gilmour had kept after an early 1970s session. Gilmour kept the tape, which also contains the unreleased "Living Alone" from the Barrett sessions. In October 2010 Harvest/EMI and Capitol Records released An Introduction to Syd Barrett—a collection of both his Pink Floyd and remastered solo work. The 2010 compilation An Introduction to Syd Barrett includes the downloadable bonus track "Rhamadan", a 20-minute track recorded at one of Syd's earliest solo sessions, in May 1968. In 2011, it was announced that a vinyl double album version would be issued for Record Store Day.

Bootleg editions of Barrett's live and solo material exist. For years the "off air" recordings of the BBC sessions with Barrett's Pink Floyd circulated, until an engineer who had taken a tape of the early Pink Floyd gave it back to the BBC—which played it during a tribute to John Peel on their website. During this tribute, the first Peel programme (Top Gear) was aired in its entirety. This show featured the 1967 live versions of "Flaming", "Set the Controls for the Heart of the Sun", and a brief 90-second snippet of the instrumental "Reaction in G". In 2012, engineer Andy Jackson said he had found "a huge box of assorted tapes", in Mason's possession, containing versions of R&B songs that (the Barrett-era) Pink Floyd played in their early years.

Creative impact 

Barrett wrote most of Pink Floyd's early material. According to critic Steven Hyden, even after Barrett left the band, Barrett's spirit "haunted" their records, and their most popular work "drew on the power of what Barrett signified".

Barrett was an innovative guitarist, using extended techniques and exploring the musical and sonic possibilities of dissonance, distortion, feedback, the echo machine, tapes and other effects; his experimentation was partly inspired by free improvisation guitarist Keith Rowe of the group AMM, active at the time in London. One of Barrett's trademarks was playing his guitar through an old echo box while sliding a Zippo lighter up and down the fret-board to create the mysterious, otherworldly sounds that became associated with the group. Barrett was known to have used Binson delay units to achieve his trademark echo sounds. Daevid Allen, founder member of Soft Machine and Gong, cited Barrett's use of slide guitar with echo as a key inspiration for his own "glissando guitar" style.

Barrett's recordings both with Pink Floyd and in later solo albums were delivered with a strongly British-accented vocal delivery, specifically that of southern England. He was described by Guardian writer Nick Kent as having a "quintessential English style of vocal projection". David Bowie said that Barrett, along with Anthony Newley, was the first person he had heard sing rock or pop music with a British accent.

Barrett's free-form sequences of "sonic carpets" pioneered a new way to play the rock guitar. He played several different guitars during his tenure, including an old Harmony hollowbody electric, a Harmony acoustic, a Fender acoustic, a single-coil Danelectro 59 DC, several different Fender Telecasters and a white Fender Stratocaster in late 1967. A silver Fender Esquire with mirrored discs glued to the body was the guitar he was most often associated with and the guitar he "felt most close to". The mirrored Esquire was traded for a black Telecaster Custom, in 1968. Its whereabouts are currently unknown.

Influence 
Many artists have acknowledged Barrett's influence on their work. Paul McCartney, Pete Townshend, Blur, Kevin Ayers, Gong, Marc Bolan, Tangerine Dream, Genesis P-Orridge, Julian Cope, Pere Ubu, Jeff Mangum, The Olivia Tremor Control, The Flaming Lips, Animal Collective, John Maus, Paul Weller, Roger Miller, East Bay Ray, Cedric Bixler-Zavala, and David Bowie were inspired by Barrett; Jimmy Page, Brian Eno, Sex Pistols, and The Damned all expressed interest in working with him at some point during the 1970s. Bowie recorded a cover of "See Emily Play" on his 1973 album Pin Ups. The track "Grass", from XTC's album Skylarking was influenced when Andy Partridge let fellow band member Colin Moulding borrow his Barrett records. Robyn Hitchcock's career was dedicated to being Barrett-esque; he even played "Dominoes" for the 2001 BBC documentary The Pink Floyd and Syd Barrett Story.

Barrett also had an influence on alternative and punk music in general. According to critic John Harris:
To understand his place in modern music you probably have to first go back to punk rock and its misguided attempt to kick aside what remained of the psychedelic 1960s. Given that the Clash and Sex Pistols had made brutal social commentary obligatory, there seemed little room for any of the creative exotica that had defined the Love Decade—until, slowly but surely, singing about dead-end lives and dole queues began to pall, and at least some of the previous generation were rehabilitated. Barrett was the best example: having crashed out of Pink Floyd before the advent of indulgent "progressive" rock, and succumbed to a fate that appealed to the punk generation's nihilism, he underwent a revival.

Barrett's decline had a profound effect on Waters' songwriting, and the theme of mental illness permeated the later Pink Floyd albums The Dark Side of the Moon (1973), Wish You Were Here (1975) and The Wall (1979). The reference to a "steel rail" in the song "Wish You Were Here"—"can you tell a green field from a cold steel rail?"—references a recurring theme in Barrett's song "If It's In You" from The Madcap Laughs. The song suite "Shine On You Crazy Diamond" from Wish You Were Here is also a tribute to Barrett.

In 1987, an album of Barrett cover songs called Beyond the Wildwood was released. The album was a collection of cover songs from Barrett's tenure with Pink Floyd and from his solo career. Artists appearing were UK and US indie bands including The Shamen, Opal, The Soup Dragons, and Plasticland.

Other artists who have written tributes to Barrett include his contemporary Kevin Ayers, who wrote "O Wot a Dream" in his honour (Barrett provided guitar to an early version of Ayers' song "Religious Experience: Singing a Song in the Morning"). Robyn Hitchcock has covered many of his songs live and on record and paid homage to his forebear with the song "(Feels Like) 1974". Phish covered "Bike", "No Good Trying", "Love You", "Baby Lemonade" and "Terrapin". The Television Personalities' single "I Know Where Syd Barrett Lives" from their 1981 album And Don't the Kids Love It is another tribute. In 2008, The Trash Can Sinatras released a single in tribute to the life and work of Syd Barrett called "Oranges and Apples", from their 2009 album In the Music. Proceeds from the single go to the Syd Barrett Trust in support of arts in mental health.

Johnny Depp showed interest in a biographical film based on Barrett's life. Barrett is portrayed briefly in the opening scene of Tom Stoppard's play Rock 'n' Roll (2006), performing "Golden Hair". His life and music, including the disastrous Cambridge Corn Exchange concert and his later reclusive lifestyle, are a recurring motif in the work. Barrett died during the play's run in London.

In 2016, in correspondence with the 70th anniversary birthday, The Theatre of the Absurd, an Italian independent artists group, published a short movie in honour of Barrett named Eclipse, with actor-director Edgar Blake in the role of Barrett. Some footage from this movie was also shown at Syd Barrett – A Celebration during Men on the Border's tribute: the show took place at the Cambridge Corn Exchange, with the participation of Barrett's family and old friends.

For 2017 TV series Legion creator Noah Hawley named one of the characters after Barrett, whose music was an important influence on the series.

In The X-Files season nine episode, "Lord of the Flies" (2001), a powerful mutant, Dylan Lokensgard (Hank Harris), has several posters of Syd Barrett on his bedroom wall, and listens to "It's No Good Trying" and "Terrapin" from The Madcap Laughs.
He recites the line, "A dream in a mist of gray", from Barrett's song "Opel", saying of the singer, "He was, like, this brilliant guy that no-one understood".

Barrett's influence on the genesis of psychedelia was considered in a chapter entitled 'Astronauts of Inner Space: Syd Barrett, Nick Drake and the Birth of Psychedelia' in Guy Mankowski's book 'Albion's Secret History: Snapshots of England's Pop Rebels and Outsiders.'

Health 

Members of Barrett's family denied that he was mentally ill. Asked if Barrett may have had Asperger's syndrome, his sister Rosemary Breen said that he and his siblings were "all on the spectrum". She also stated that, contrary to common misconception, Barrett neither suffered from mental illness nor had he received treatment for it since they had resumed regular contact in the 1980s. Breen said he had spent some time in a private "home for lost souls"—Greenwoods in Essex—but that there was no formal therapy programme there. Some years later, Barrett agreed to sessions with a psychiatrist at Fulbourn psychiatric hospital in Cambridge, but Breen said that neither medication nor therapy was considered appropriate. Breen also denied Barrett was a recluse or that he was vague about his past: "Roger may have been a bit selfish—or rather self-absorbed—but when people called him a recluse they were really only projecting their own disappointment. He knew what they wanted, but he wasn't willing to give it to them." In 1996, Wright said that Barrett's mother told the members of Pink Floyd to not contact him because being reminded of the band would make him depressed for weeks.

In the 1960s, Barrett used psychedelic drugs, especially LSD, and there are theories he subsequently had schizophrenia. Wright asserted that Barrett's problems stemmed from a massive overdose of acid, as the change in his personality and behaviour came on suddenly. However, Waters maintains that Barrett suffered "without a doubt" from schizophrenia. In an article published in 2006, Gilmour was quoted as saying: "In my opinion, his nervous breakdown would have happened anyway. It was a deep-rooted thing. But I'll say the psychedelic experience might well have acted as a catalyst. Still, I just don't think he could deal with the vision of success and all the things that went with it." According to Gilmour in a 1974 interview, the other members of Pink Floyd approached psychiatrist R. D. Laing with the "Barrett problem". After hearing a tape of a Barrett conversation, Laing declared him "incurable".

In Saucerful of Secrets: The Pink Floyd Odyssey, author Nicholas Schaffner interviewed people who knew Barrett before and during his Pink Floyd days, including friends Peter and Susan Wynne-Wilson, artist Duggie Fields (with whom Barrett shared a flat during the late 1960s), June Bolan, and Storm Thorgerson. Bolan became concerned when Syd "kept his girlfriend under lock and key for three days, occasionally shoving a ration of biscuits under the door". A claim of cruelty against Barrett committed by the groupies and hangers-on who frequented his apartment during this period was described by writer and critic Jonathan Meades. "I went [to Barrett's flat] to see Harry and there was this terrible noise. It sounded like heating pipes shaking. I said, 'What's up?' and he sort of giggled and said, 'That's Syd having a bad trip. We put him in the linen cupboard'". Storm Thorgerson responded to this claim by stating "I do not remember locking Syd up in a cupboard. It sounds to me like pure fantasy, like Jonathan Meades was on dope himself."

Other friends state that Barrett's flatmates, who had also taken LSD, thought of Barrett as a genius or a deity, and were spiking his morning coffee every day without his knowledge, leaving him in a never-ending trip. He was later rescued from that flat by friends and moved elsewhere, but his erratic behaviour continued. According to Thorgerson, "On one occasion, I had to pull him [Barrett] off [his girlfriend] Lindsay because he was beating her over the head with a mandolin". On one occasion, Barrett threw a woman called Gilly across the room, because she refused to go to Gilmour's house.

Personal life 

According to his sister, Rosemary, Barrett took up photography and sometimes they went to the seaside together. She also said he took a keen interest in art and horticulture and continued to devote himself to painting:

Barrett had relationships with various women, such as Libby Gausden; Lindsay Korner; Jenny Spires; and Pakistani-born Evelyn "Iggy" Rose (1947–2017) (aka "Iggy the Eskimo", "Iggy the Inuit"), who appeared on the back cover of The Madcap Laughs. He never married or had children, though he was briefly engaged to marry Gayla Pinion and planned to relocate to Oxford.

Discography 

Solo albums
 The Madcap Laughs (1970)
 Barrett (1970)

with Pink Floyd
 The Piper at the Gates of Dawn (1967)
 A Saucerful of Secrets (1968)
 1965: Their First Recordings (2015)
 The Early Years 1965–1972 (2016)

Filmography 
 Syd Barrett's First Trip (1966) directed by Nigel Lesmoir-Gordon
 London '66–'67 (1967)
 Tonite Let's All Make Love in London (1967)
 The Pink Floyd and Syd Barrett Story (2003)

See also 

 List of songs recorded by Syd Barrett
 List of songs about or referencing Syd Barrett

References

Informational notes

Citations

Bibliography

External links 

 The Official Syd Barrett Website
 The Syd Barrett Archives
 

 
1946 births
2006 deaths
20th-century English composers
20th-century English painters
20th-century English male singers
20th-century English singers
21st-century English painters
Alumni of Anglia Ruskin University
Alumni of Camberwell College of Arts
Blues rock musicians
Capitol Records artists
Deaths from cancer in England
Deaths from pancreatic cancer
EMI Records artists
English experimental musicians
English male painters
English rock guitarists
English rock singers
English male singer-songwriters
Experimental composers
Experimental guitarists
Harvest Records artists
Lead guitarists
Musicians from Cambridgeshire
Outsider musicians
People with schizophrenia
Pink Floyd members
Protopunk musicians
Psychedelic folk musicians
Psychedelic rock musicians
Rhythm guitarists
Slide guitarists
English male guitarists
20th-century British guitarists
English people with disabilities